The Gator Horn is an album by saxophonist Willis Jackson which was recorded in 1977 and first released on the Muse label.

Reception 

In his review on Allmusic, Scott Yanow states that "Jackson's basic tenor always contained plenty of soul, the potential of exploding, and an attractive warm sound. For this fine set, Gator alternates between romps (some of which are funky) and ballads."

Track listing 
All compositions by Willis Jackson except where noted.
 "Ungawa" – 8:32
 "You've Changed" (Bill Carey, Carl T. Fischer) – 4:45
 "Hello, Good Luck" (Johnny Griffin) – 7:35
 "The Gator Horn" – 5:05
 "This Is Always" (Mack Gordon, Harry Warren) – 5:30
 "Gooseneck" – 8:15

Personnel 
Willis Jackson – tenor saxophone, "Gator" horn
Joe Jones – guitar
Carl Wilson – organ
Dud Bascomb Jr. – bass
Yusef Ali – drums
Buddy Caldwell – congas

References 

Willis Jackson (saxophonist) albums
1977 albums
Muse Records albums